Fleece are a Canadian indie rock band, originating from Montreal. It consists of Matt Rogers (vocals/keyboard), Megan Ennenberg (guitar/vocals), Jameson Daniel (guitar), and Ethan Soil (drums). They released their first album Scavenger in 2015, and gained notoriety when Rogers' and Soil's "how to write an Alt-J song" went viral on YouTube in May 2015. They released their second album Voyager in 2017 and Stunning & Atrocious in 2021.

History
Rogers, Soil and Miller began jamming together as teenagers in Toronto during summer camp. The band was formed in 2013 when the trio left for Montreal to study at Concordia and McGill University, meeting Jonathan Bell and Colin Spratt. Their debut album, Scavenger was named after their patchy process of arranging eclectic pieces of music. In May 2015, the band uploaded "how to write an Alt-J song" on YouTube, a humorous parody of the band, which included Soil eating rice cakes during the performance. In response to the video going viral, Alt-J briefly changed their Twitter display picture to a rice cake.

Bell and Spratt left, while Ennenberg and Daniel joined between the band's second album, Voyager, which was released in January 2017. Fleece funded the album's 17-show American tour on Kickstarter.

In June 2020, the band released "So Long". The proceeds from the first month of streams were donated to the Black Youth Helpline, the Black Coalition for AIDS Prevention and the Native Women's Association of Canada.

The band reformed as a "queer quartet" for their third album, Stunning & Atrocious, which was released in August 2021. The band toured North America through the fall.

Musical style and influences
Fleece's earlier work has drawn comparisons Radiohead, The Pixies, and Tame Impala. Exclaim! drew comparisons of the band's sophomore effort to psychedelic, grunge, and Toronto jazz trio BADBADNOTGOOD. In an interview with Indie88, Rogers cited improvisation as a crucial part of their artistic process.

Discography

Albums
 2015: Scavenger
 2017: Voyager
 2021: Stunning & Atrocious

Singles
 2020: "Love Song for the Haters"
 2020: "So Long"
 2020: "Upside Down"
 2020: "Do U Mind? (Leave the Light On)"
 2021: "Bodies Lie"

Music videos
 2020: "Upside Down"
 2021: "Do U Mind? (Leave the Light On)"

Members

Current members
 Matt Rogers – vocals, keyboard
 Megan Ennenberg – vocals, guitar
 Ethan Soil – drums
 Jameson Daniel – guitar, vocals

Past members
 Gabe Miller
 Colin Spratt
 Jonathan Bell

References 

Canadian indie rock groups
Musical groups established in 2013